The Little Teacher is a 1915 American short comedy film starring Mabel Normand and Fatty Arbuckle, and directed by Mack Sennett.

Cast
 Mabel Normand as The Little Teacher
 Roscoe 'Fatty' Arbuckle as Fat Student
 Mack Sennett as Tall Student
 Bobby Dunn
 Owen Moore as Teacher's Fiancé
 Billie Brockwell (uncredited)
 Vivian Edwards (uncredited)
 Frank Hayes (uncredited)
 Frank Opperman (uncredited)

See also
 Fatty Arbuckle filmography

References

External links

1915 films
1915 comedy films
1915 short films
American silent short films
American black-and-white films
Silent American comedy films
American comedy short films
Films directed by Mack Sennett
1910s American films